Kaghaz is the Persian word for paper. It was borrowed and adapted into many other languages.

History
The Persian word kaghaz is a borrowing from Sogdian kʾɣδʾ, itself in turn possibly borrowed from Chinese (紙). The Persian word was loaned into numerous other languages, including Arabic, Bengali (কাগজ), Georgian (ქაღალდი), Kurdish, Marathi (कागद), Nepali, Telugu, and the various Turkic languages. Through the Ottoman conquest of the Balkans the Persian kaghaz entered the languages of the region through Ottoman Turkish, including Serbian, where it generated the word for "documentation" (ćage).

The increased access to paper had spread from China to Samarqand in Transoxania and then Khorasan by the mid-8th century. By 981, paper had spread to Armenian and Georgian monasteries in the Caucasus. It spread to India by the 13th century.

The modern historian Nile Green explains that the increased access to paper had a role in the expansion of Persian into bureaucratic and in turn literary activities, that is, the domain of written Persian ("Persographia") in large parts of Eurasia.

See also
 History of paper
 Persianate society
 Greater Iran
 Unruled Paper (film), English name of the Persian film Kāghaz-e bi Khatt

Notes

References

Further reading

External links

Persian words and phrases
Paper